Devrient  is a surname.  

It may refer to:

Family of actors
Ludwig Devrient (1784–1832), uncle to Karl August, Eduard, Emil
Karl August Devrient (1797–1872), nephew of Ludwig, brother of Eduard and Emil, married to Wilhelmine
Eduard Devrient (1801–1877), nephew of Ludwig, brother of Karl August and Emil, father of Otto
Emil Devrient (1803–1872), nephew of Ludwig, brother of Karl August and Eduard
Wilhelmine Schröder-Devrient (1804–1860), opera singer, married to Karl August
Otto Devrient (1838–1894), son of Eduard, nephew of Karl August and Emil

See also
Giesecke & Devrient, German printing firm specialising in bank notes